Torrellano Illice Elche Parque Empresarial Club de Fútbol, known as Torrellano Illice, was a Spanish football team based in Torrellano, Elche, in the Valencian Community. Founded in 2009 and dissolved in 2011, it held home games at Polideportivo Isabel Fernández, with a capacity of 2,000 spectators.

History
Torrellano Illice was founded in 2009, after a merger between Torrellano CF and CD Illice.
 
In June 2011, after two seasons in Tercera División, the club's seat was sold to Huracán CF, and moved to Valencia.

Season to season

2 seasons in Tercera División

Famous players
 François Obele (74 appearances/56 goals)
 Sipo

References

External links
Official website 
Futbolme team profile 

Sport in Elche
Association football clubs established in 2009
Association football clubs disestablished in 2011
2009 establishments in Spain
2011 disestablishments in Spain
Defunct football clubs in the Valencian Community